The battle of the 25 of Abu (10 of August) of 309 B.C. in an unknown location between Babylon and Susa, was the decisive and final clash of the Babylonian war. It ended in a Seleucid victory, and the establishment of the Seleucid kingdom

Background
Seleucus had retaken Babylon, sometime between 312-311 B.C. He had been the province's satrap before, but was forced to leave, fearing Antigonus' increasing power and cruelty. The Antigonids made several attempts to retake the "gateway" to the rich eastern satrapies, but ended in failure. Antigonus made peace with the other diadochi (Ptolemy, Cassander and Lysimachus) and marched to Babylon with an army of 75,000 according to some sources, Seleucus then decided to wage a guerilla war, but Antigonus responded by pillaging and razing the territory, finally forcing Seleucus to face him on open ground, with a significantly smaller force.

Battle
When the two armies met they fought an inconclusive engagement, both retired to their camps for the night; but whereas Antigonus's army disarmed and went to sleep, Seleucus ordered his men to dine and rest in full armor and in their ranks. The next morning, as the sun rose from the backs of the already deployed Seleucid phalanx, they began their advance and caught the enemy by surprise, overwhelming the enemy and routing his army. Antigonus managed to escape and gave up on the idea of reconquering the upper satrapies leaving the east to Seleucus.

References

Sources
 
 
 Antigonus the One-Eyed: Greatest of the Successors by Jeff Champions
 
 Richard A. Billows, Antigonos the One-Eyed and the Creation of the Hellenistic State.

309 BC
25 of Abu
25 of Abu
25 of Abu